is a professional Japanese baseball player. He plays pitcher for the Yokohama DeNA BayStars.

References 

1994 births
Living people
Baseball people from Kanagawa Prefecture
Japanese baseball players
Nippon Professional Baseball pitchers
Yokohama DeNA BayStars players